Novogeorgiyevka is the name of several rural localities in Russia:
Novogeorgiyevka, Mikhaylovsky District, Amur Oblast, a selo in Mikhaylovsky Selsoviet of Mikhaylovsky District, Amur Oblast
Novogeorgiyevka, Shimanovsky District, Amur Oblast, a selo in Novogeorgiyevsky Selsoviet of Oktyabrsky District, Amur Oblast